Edward Kutchat was an Indian tribal leader and the Chief of the Tribal Council of Car Nicobar island. He was featured in the media for cooperating with the Indian Government by offering his land for the expansion of airfields in Car Nicobar island, in exchange for the jacket worn by Jawaharlal Nehru, on a visit to the island. He was also reported to have assisted Nicobarese people in promoting their business. The Government of India awarded him the fourth highest civilian honour of Padma Shri in 1989.

See also

 Nehru jacket
 Nicobarese people

References

Further reading
 

Recipients of the Padma Shri in social work
Year of birth missing
Year of death missing
People from Nicobar district
Tribal chiefs
20th-century Indian people